Kurita may refer to:

People
 Kurita Chodō (1749–1814), Japanese poet of the Edo period 
 Eiji Kurita (born 1938), Japanese cross-country skier
 Genzo Kurita (1926–1959), Japanese serial killer
 Kanichi Kurita (born 1958), Japanese actor and comedian
M. Sue Kurita, American judge
 Mark Ajay Kurita (born 1998), Japanese footballer
 Naoki Kurita (born 1971), Japanese sport shooter
 Rosalind Kurita (fl. from 1996), American politician
 Shigetaka Kurita (born 1972), Japanese interface designer
 Taijiro Kurita (born 1975), Japanese footballer
 Takeo Kurita (1889–1977), vice admiral in the Imperial Japanese Navy during World War II
 Toyomichi Kurita (born 1950), Japanese cinematographer
 Yutaka Kurita (born 1940), Japanese martial artist

Other uses
 Kurita District, Shiga, a place in Japan
 Kurita Water Industries, a Japanese company 
 Ryokan Kurita, a fictional character in Eyeshield 21
 Yūko Kurita, a fictional character in Oishinbo
 House Kurita, a dynastic ruling family in the fictional setting of the tabletop wargaming franchise BattleTech

See also

Japanese-language surnames